Guaraní International Airport  is an international airport located in the municipality of Minga Guazú, and serving Ciudad del Este. It is the second most important and international airport in Paraguay.

History
The airport was dedicated on 20 August 1993.

The facility was built to replace the former Alejo García Airport in Ciudad del Este, which eventually was surrounded by the city's development.

During the 1990s, the airport generated much movement and had up to four flights per day with airlines such as Ladesa, Arpa and the Military Transport. In 2013, the administrator of the airport, Gerardo Brítez Mussa, stated that Paraguayans must acquire the habit of travelling by airplane and that the airport needs more operations of passengers. "The Paraguayans must acquire the culture of air travel, for a better advantage of our day and age and a better quality of life, because the non use of air travel is not only because of the cost but because we have not acquired this mode of life. This will allow companies that come, to stay" stated Brítez Mussa.

Airlines and destinations

Passenger

Cargo

Statistics

These data show number of passengers movements into the airport, according to the Dirección Nacional de Aeronáutica Civil's Aviation Sector Summary Reports.

Access

Gallery

See also

List of airports in Paraguay
Transport in Paraguay
List of airports by ICAO code: S#SG - Paraguay

References

External links

Airports in Paraguay
Ciudad del Este
Alto Paraná Department